The Northern New South Wales Zone Football League Three, or simply Zone League Three, wasan Australian soccer league in the North of New South Wales. It was the sixth and bottom tier of football in the Northern New South Wales Football 6-tier system behind the NPL Northern NSW, Northern NSW State League Division 1, Zone Premier League, Zone League One and Zone League Two until is dissolution in 2023 due to a restructure to the Zone Football Leagues.

Teams are currently not promoted or relegated between Northern NSW State League Division 1 and Zone Premier League.

The players in the league are amateur.

2022 Season Teams
The competition is made up of 7 teams in 2022, each playing each other three times, home and away.

Bellbird Junior FC1
Cardiff City FC
Hamilton Azzurri Junior SC1
Kurri Kurri Junior FC
Medowie FC
Newcastle Croatia FC1
Raymond Terrace SC1
*Italics indicate the club possesses a team in a higher grade.

1Promoted from all age

All teams are required to present 2 grades - Reserve Grade and First Grade. Promotion is made from the success of the First Grade team

References

 Zone League Competitions
 Northern NSW Football Federation
 Newcastle Football
 Macquarie Football
 Hunter Valley Football

Soccer leagues in New South Wales